An All-American team is an honorary sports team composed of the best amateur players of a specific season for each team position—who in turn are given the honorific "All-America" and typically referred to as "All-American athletes", or simply "All-Americans".  Although the honorees generally do not compete together as a unit, the term is used in U.S. team sports to refer to players who are selected by members of the national media.  Walter Camp selected the first All-America team in the early days of American football in 1889.

From 1947 to 1980, the American Baseball Coaches Association was the only All-American selector recognized by the NCAA.

Key

All-Americans

See also
Baseball awards#U.S. college baseball

References

College Baseball All-America Teams
All-America